Yummy may refer to:

People
Robert "Yummy" Sandifer, a Black Disciples gang member killed in 1994 at eleven years of age
Yummy Bingham (born 1986), American R&B singer

Music
Yummy (album), a 2007 album by KC and the Sunshine Band
Yummy, Yummy, Yummy (album), a 1969 album by Julie London
"Yummy" (Chelo song), a song from Chelo's album 360° 
"Yummy" (Gwen Stefani song), a 2006 song from Gwen Stefani's album The Sweet Escape
"Yummy" (Justin Bieber song), a 2020 song from Justin Bieber's album Changes
"Yummy Yummy Yummy", a song first recorded by the Ohio Express in 1968

Film and television
Yummy (film), a 2019 Belgian comedy horror film
Yummy Yummy, a Singaporean film
Yummy (Kamen Rider), the fictional monsters from the 2010 Tokusatsu show Kamen Rider OOO

See also
Yum (disambiguation)
Yumi (disambiguation)
The Yummy Fur, an indie band from Glasgow, Scotland
Yummy Fur (comics), a comic by Chester Brown
Yummy Mummy, a General Mills brand of cereal